"The Country Husband" was an American television movie broadcast on November 1, 1956, as part of the CBS television series, Playhouse 90.

Plot
After a car crash and the arrival of a beautiful babysitter, a young businessman, William Wiley, considers leaving his wife for the babysitter.

Cast
 Frank Lovejoy as William Wiley
 Barbara Hale as Julia Wiley
 Felicia Farr as Anne Murchison
 Kerwin Mathews as Clay Farrell
 Herbert Rudley as Farrell Sr.
 Jeanne Cooper as Shirl
 John Zaremba as Mr. Murchison
 Hugh Sanders as Robert Guinness
 S. John Launer as Passenger

Red Skelton hosted the program.

Production
The film was produced by Screen Gems beginning in June 1956. Eva Wolas was the producer and James Neilson the director. Paul Monash wrote the teleplay based on a short story ("The Country Husband") by John Cheever.

References

1956 American television episodes
Playhouse 90 (season 1) episodes
1956 television plays